Martin Boswell McKneally (December 31, 1914 – June 14, 1992) was a Republican member of the United States House of Representatives from New York. He also served as the National Commander of The American Legion from 1959 to 1960.

Early life 
McKneally was born in Newburgh, New York, the son of George F. and Ellen (née Lahey) McKneally.  He attended Newburgh's public schools, and graduated from Newburgh Free Academy.  McKneally graduated from the College of the Holy Cross in 1936 and Fordham University School of Law in 1940.  McKneally was admitted to the bar and practiced law in Newburgh and New York City.

Military service
McKneally was drafted in 1941.  He attended The JAG School then at University of Michigan and entered U.S. Army JAG Corps. He received his commission as a second lieutenant in the Army Judge Advocate General's Corps.  He taught military law at Grinnell College, then deployed to the Pacific theater.  In the Pacific, he served on the staff Lieutenant General Robert C. Richardson, commander of the Central Pacific Area.  He was released from service in 1946 with the rank of major.

Continued career
He was New York's state American Legion commander from 1957 to 1958, and national American Legion commander from 1959 until 1960.  His administration of the American Legion was notable in that he disaffiliated the 40 and 8 Society from the Legion due to their racially discriminatory membership requirements.

McKneally was active in local government, and served as president of Newburgh's school board.  He was a special counsel to Lieutenant Governor Malcolm Wilson from 1960 to 1968, and counsel to the 1964 World's Fair from 1961 to 1965.  In 1968, he was elected to Congress, defeating Democratic incumbent John G. Dow.  He served from January 3, 1969, until January 3, 1971.

Tax evasion charges
McKneally was a candidate for re-election in 1970, but it was revealed during the last month of the 1970 campaign that he had not paid Federal income taxes for many years. He claimed that the IRS had over withheld him, but the voters did not believe him and he was defeated by Dow, 52% to 48%. McKneally was later found guilty of tax evasion and sentenced to one year of probation and fined.

Death and burial
McKneally never married and had no children.  His siblings included his brother George, who served as mayor of Newburgh.  He died at the Veterans Administration facility in Castle Point, New York on June 14, 1992. He was buried at Cedar Hill Cemetery and Mausoleum in Newburgh.

See also 

List of American federal politicians convicted of crimes
List of federal political scandals in the United States
List of United States representatives from New York

References

External links

Martin B. McKneally at The Political Graveyard

|-

1914 births
1992 deaths
20th-century American lawyers
20th-century American politicians
American people of Irish descent
Burials in New York (state)
College of the Holy Cross alumni
Fordham University School of Law alumni
National Commanders of the American Legion
New York (state) lawyers
Republican Party members of the United States House of Representatives from New York (state)
The Judge Advocate General's Legal Center and School alumni